The 1979–80 NBA season was the SuperSonics' 13th season in the NBA. The SuperSonics entered the season as the defending NBA champions, having defeated the Washington Bullets in five games in the 1979 NBA Finals, winning their first and only NBA championship.

In the playoffs, the SuperSonics defeated the Portland Trail Blazers in three games in the First Round, then defeated the Milwaukee Bucks in seven games in the Semi-finals, before losing to the eventual NBA champion Los Angeles Lakers in five games in the Conference Finals.

Draft picks

Roster

Regular season

Season standings

Record vs. opponents

Game log

Playoffs

|- align="center" bgcolor="#ccffcc"
| 1
| April 2
| Portland
| W 120–110
| Gus Williams (35)
| three players tied (8)
| Gus Williams (6)
| Kingdome26,412
| 1–0
|- align="center" bgcolor="#ffcccc"
| 2
| April 4
| @ Portland
| L 95–105 (OT)
| Dennis Johnson (24)
| Lonnie Shelton (12)
| Gus Williams (8)
| Memorial Coliseum12,666
| 1–1
|- align="center" bgcolor="#ccffcc"
| 3
| April 6
| Portland
| W 103–86
| Gus Williams (21)
| John Johnson (8)
| Williams, D. Johnson (6)
| Kingdome23,546
| 2–1
|-

|- align="center" bgcolor="#ccffcc"
| 1
| April 8
| Milwaukee
| W 114–113 (OT)
| Gus Williams (30)
| Jack Sikma (11)
| John Johnson (6)
| Seattle Center Coliseum13,648
| 1–0
|- align="center" bgcolor="#ffcccc"
| 2
| April 9
| Milwaukee
| L 112–114 (OT)
| Lonnie Shelton (25)
| Lonnie Shelton (9)
| Williams, J. Johnson (7)
| Seattle Center Coliseum14,050
| 1–1
|- align="center" bgcolor="#ffcccc"
| 3
| April 11
| @ Milwaukee
| L 91–95
| Jack Sikma (20)
| Jack Sikma (13)
| Williams, J. Johnson (7)
| MECCA Arena10,938
| 1–2
|- align="center" bgcolor="#ccffcc"
| 4
| April 13
| @ Milwaukee
| W 112–107
| Gus Williams (32)
| Lonnie Shelton (15)
| John Johnson (7)
| MECCA Arena10,938
| 2–2
|- align="center" bgcolor="#ffcccc"
| 5
| April 15
| Milwaukee
| L 97–108
| Gus Williams (22)
| Jack Sikma (9)
| Dennis Johnson (7)
| Kingdome40,172
| 2–3
|- align="center" bgcolor="#ccffcc"
| 6
| April 18
| @ Milwaukee
| W 86–85
| Dennis Johnson (18)
| Paul Silas (14)
| John Johnson (7)
| MECCA Arena10,938
| 3–3
|- align="center" bgcolor="#ccffcc"
| 7
| April 20
| Milwaukee
| W 98–94
| Gus Williams (33)
| Lonnie Shelton (15)
| Dennis Johnson (5)
| Seattle Center Coliseum14,050
| 4–3
|-

|- align="center" bgcolor="#ccffcc"
| 1
| April 22
| @ Los Angeles
| W 108–107
| Gus Williams (28)
| Lonnie Shelton (9)
| John Johnson (9)
| The Forum17,505
| 1–0
|- align="center" bgcolor="#ffcccc"
| 2
| April 23
| @ Los Angeles
| L 99–108
| Gus Williams (24)
| Jack Sikma (11)
| Jack Sikma (8)
| The Forum17,505
| 1–1
|- align="center" bgcolor="#ffcccc"
| 3
| April 25
| Los Angeles
| L 100–104
| Gus Williams (23)
| John Johnson (9)
| Gus Williams (11)
| Hec Edmundson Pavilion8,524
| 1–2
|- align="center" bgcolor="#ffcccc"
| 4
| April 27
| Los Angeles
| L 93–98
| Gus Williams (25)
| Dennis Johnson (9)
| Gus Williams (7)
| Hec Edmundson Pavilion8,524
| 1–3
|- align="center" bgcolor="#ffcccc"
| 5
| April 30
| @ Los Angeles
| L 105–111
| Dennis Johnson (29)
| Jack Sikma (9)
| Williams, J. Johnson (6)
| The Forum17,505
| 1–4
|-

Player statistics

Season

Playoffs

Awards and records
 Dennis Johnson, All-NBA Second Team
 Gus Williams, All-NBA Second Team
 Dennis Johnson, NBA All-Defensive First Team

Transactions
October 19, 1979
 Waived Joe Hassett.
 Waived Jackie Robinson.

October 11, 1979
 Waived Dennis Awtrey.

See also
 1979-80 NBA season

References

Seattle SuperSonics seasons
Sea